Kim Seung-ho (July 13, 1917 – December 1, 1968) was a Korean actor. Kim was a star of the 1950s and 1960s and regarded as one of the best actors in Korean film history. Kim started acting at the age of 20, but he took lead roles when he was over 40 years old. Kim is also the father of actor Kim Hee-ra.

Filmography
*Note; the whole list is referenced.

Acting

Planner

Awards
 1963, the 1st, Blue Dragon Film Awards : Best Actor (혈맥)
 1964, the 3rd Grand Bell Awards : Best Actor (혈맥)
 1967, the 5th Blue Dragon Film Awards : Best Actor (만선)

References

External links

1917 births
1968 deaths
South Korean male film actors
20th-century South Korean male actors
South Korean Buddhists